Jeremy Joseph Fikac (born April 8, 1975) is an American former Major League Baseball relief pitcher who played for the San Diego Padres (–), Oakland Athletics, and Montreal Expos.

Early life 
Fikac was born in Shiner, Texas, and attended Texas State University.

Career 
Fikac was selected in the 19th round of the 1998 Major League Baseball draft by the San Diego Padres. After seven years in MLB, he returned to his alma mater as a volunteer assistant coach and was promoted to full-time assistant in 2008; working as the hitting instructor. In 2012, after the departure of assistant coach Derek Matlock (hired at West Virginia University), Fikac was promoted to pitching coach.

External links 

1975 births
Living people
Major League Baseball pitchers
Baseball players from Texas
People from Shiner, Texas
San Diego Padres players
Oakland Athletics players
Montreal Expos players
Rancho Cucamonga Quakes players
Mobile BayBears players
Portland Beavers players
Sacramento River Cats players
Edmonton Trappers players
Fresno Grizzlies players
Texas State Bobcats baseball players
Texas State Bobcats baseball coaches
American expatriate baseball players in Canada